Martin Hill may refer to:

People 
 Martin Hill (camera collector), American antique camera collector 
 Martin Hill (cricketer) (born 1945), former English cricketer
 Martin Hill (visual effects artist), British visual effects artist

Places 
 Martin Hill (New York), a hill in New York, United States
 Martin Hill (Pennsylvania), a mountain ridge in Bedford County, Pennsylvania, United States
 Martin Hill (Antarctica), a hill at the west side of Whitehall Glacier in the Victory Mountains of Victoria Land

Hill, Martin